Coptis teeta is a rare species of flowering plant in the buttercup family.

Medicinal uses
It is a species of importance in Chinese herbology. Known as Yunnan goldthread, its rhizome is used as an antimicrobial and anti-inflammatory.

Habitat
A number of factors contribute to its endangerment. It is endemic to a very small area in the eastern Himalayas where its habitat is rapidly declining, due in part to deforestation, it is overcollected for medicinal use, and its reproductive success is low. The plant is cultivated on a small scale in Yunnan using techniques that aim to conserve the species within its natural habitat. The Lisu people of the local area earn much of their income from cultivation of the plant, which they grow using traditional agroforestry methods that have little adverse impact on the ecosystem.

References

teeta
Flora of China
Plants used in traditional Chinese medicine
Fauna of Yunnan